Meenachil is a village in Kottayam district in the state of Kerala, India.

Demographics
 India census, Meenachil had a population of 15264 with 7619 males and 7645 females.

References

Villages in Kottayam district